Rocketry: The Nambi Effect is a 2022 Indian biographical drama film written, produced and directed by R. Madhavan in his directorial debut. The film is based on the life of Nambi Narayanan, played by Madhavan, a scientist at the Indian Space Research Organisation, who was accused in the ISRO espionage case and later exonerated. The story spans across Narayanan's days as a graduate student at Princeton University, before exploring his work as a scientist and the false espionage charges placed upon him.

After its official announcement in October 2018, principal photography took place across several countries including India, Russia and France. The cinematography and editing were handled by Sirsha Ray and Bijith Bala, respectively, while the original score is composed by Sam C. S. Rocketry was filmed simultaneously in Tamil, Hindi and English languages.

Rocketry premiered at the 2022 Cannes Film Festival on 19 May, and was theatrically released in India on 1 July 2022. The film opened to mostly positive reviews from critics, who praised the performances of Madhavan and Simran, the screenplay and the creator's noble intention to make the film.

Plot

During the present time in a televised interview with actor Shah Rukh Khan (Hindi)/Suriya (Tamil), Nambi walks through the events leading to his rise as an eminent engineer to alleged espionage charges, physical and mental cruelty against him.

Nambi starts with his experiences at the Thumba Equatorial Rocket Launching Station, where he saves A. P. J. Abdul Kalam, one of his team members from a major injury during an experiment. In 1969, he is accepted into Princeton University in the US.

Nambi successfully completes his MSE program in chemical rocket propulsion under professor Luigi Crocco who recommends him for the NASA fellowship. However, after a brief stint at NASA with Barry Amaldev, he is offered a generous paycheck and other allowances. He rejects it and returns to India so that he may make use of his talents at ISRO. Subsequently, he also manages to get 400 million pounds of equipment from Scotland for free. However, after the suspicious death of Vikram Sarabhai, he did not have adequate support from ISRO or funds from the Indian government to continue his research.

At this point, Nambi strikes a deal with the French who need skilled scientists to help them build their own liquid fuel engine. He then moves to France with his colleagues, hoping to learn from France's advanced technology so that they may recreate it back in India. Unbeknownst to the French, Nambi and his 52 colleagues have learnt French before their journey but pretend to not understand them. After being kept out of their major discussions, Nambi's team tries to find a way to gain access to these meetings and test data. It is then that they discover that the French engine is faulty. Nambi uses this opportunity to gain access to the required data in exchange for fixing the engine. The team then returns to India and start working on building their own engine on liquid fuels. However, due to lack of resources, it takes 8 more years to complete. They test the engine at the same testing facility in France - it goes above the 135 pressure mark, and goes all the way to 180. Successful in his plans, Nambi returns to India after naming the engine VIKAS after Vikram Sarabhai, his mentor.

Nambi's focus is now on cryogenic engines which he believes will make India competent to participate in the world satellite market. Knowing ISRO's limitations in terms of time and resources, Nambi decides to purchase these engines from some other country. He strikes a deal with Russia (then USSR) after informing them that he knows about their cryogenic missiles, told to him by his Russian friend in Princeton. He requests 4 of them to be imported to India. After the Russians agree, the Americans find out about this deal and try their best to break it. While USSR is on the brink of collapse, Nambi and his colleagues manage to expedite the transfer process and sneak out a couple of engines from under the Americans' nose with the help of the Russians. 

Back in India, Nambi is arrested out of the blue while news of his treason spreads like wildfire. He is taken to a guest house in Trivandrum where he is beaten and tortured in an attempt to make him confess to his alleged crimes. He also recognizes that the officials are trying to make him repeat their sentences and that there is a recording device in the room to capture it. However, Nambi holds his ground and denies all charges. It was alleged that Nambi met Mariam, a Maldivian woman, in a hotel in Chennai and after being caught in her trap, he was forced to sell India's rocketry secrets to Pakistan. After being hospitalized due to his injuries, Nambi is met by CBI official P. M. Nair, who thoroughly investigates the matter. Nair brings Mariam and her friend, along with a few others into the room. Mariam and her friend reveal that the Kerala police officer in charge of the investigation, Gopal, tortured and threatened them and made them falsely incriminate Nambi, whom they have never met before. They also apologize to Nambi for ruining his reputation and causing pain to him and his family. Nair also figures out that all the accused in this case were members of ISRO's cryogenic wing, and concludes that it was a huge ploy by some powerful parties to hinder India's progress in the cryogenic sector. 

Months later, Nambi receives bail and returns to his house to find his family members traumatized by the way they were treated by others. Nambi's wife Meena is in need of psychiatric help and the rest of his family are still shunned by the society. Hence, Nambi decides that he has to clear his name so that his family may lead normal lives in the future. Years later, Nambi is proven innocent by the Supreme Court and returns to ISRO, helping his colleagues with the Mangalyaan mission. Nambi is later awarded the Padma Bhushan for his contributions to Indian Space Research.

After hearing his story, Shah Rukh Khan (Hindi)/Suriya (Tamil) feels so bad for Nambi, that he apologizes to Nambi on the behalf of the whole nation, as the interview ends. The real Nambi is shown receiving the Padma Bhushan award from the president, Ram Nath Kovind.

Cast 

Additionally, Nambi Narayanan portrays himself for the last 15 minutes of the film.

Production

Development 
A film based on the espionage case of Indian Space Research Organisation (ISRO) scientist Nambi Narayanan was first announced to the media in September 2012 by director Anant Mahadevan. Journalist C. P. Surendran had proposed the idea for a potential film on Narayanan to Mahadevan during June 2012. The two then met Narayanan in person to discuss the idea and seek his permission, and he agreed to serve as a consultant for the project. Malayalam actor Mohanlal was cast in the role of Narayanan, while Resul Pookutty, Sreekar Prasad and L. Subramaniam were finalised as the sound designer, editor and music composer for the project. Titled The Witch Hunt, the film was to be made in the Hindi and Malayalam languages. The team were in talks with several production houses but the project eventually did not take off as planned. Mahadevan later narrated the idea of the film to actor R. Madhavan in the mid-2010s, who helped take the film forward.

Work on Rocketry: The Nambi Effect was first reported by Madhavan in the media during April 2017, when he announced that he was set to appear in a biopic featuring the "extraordinary story of an unsung hero", who was "neither an actor nor a sportsman". He called the project his "biggest film ever" and stated that he had worked silently on the script of the film for a period of two years after becoming intrigued by hearing the tale of Narayanan's false espionage charge. To develop the script and to provide a more factual account of the events, Madhavan regularly met with Narayanan, garnering his approval for the film and discussing the scientist's life experiences. As a result of their conversations, Madhavan chose to alter his original script to include portions from Narayanan's entire career and his services to the Indian space programme, rather than just matters related to the espionage case and his 1994 arrest. For the script, he also took inspiration from Narayanan's autobiography Ormakalude Bhramanapadham (2017) and Arun Ram's official biography of the scientist titled Ready To Fire: How India and I Survived the ISRO Spy Case (2018).

In October 2017, Madhavan confirmed that pre-production work for the film was underway and that he would portray Narayanan from the ages of 27 to 75, and that he was gaining weight to film the scenes featuring the older version of Narayanan first, after taking advice from Aamir Khan. Madhavan also announced that alongside his screenwriting and acting credits, he would also be one of the producers of the project. In regard to the making of the film, Madhavan stated that he hoped to differ in the script in comparison to other biographical films, and suggested that he would not call the film a "biopic" but an "incisive investigation into a brilliant mind and India's ambitious space technology". He also added that he felt that Madhavan was the "only Indian actor qualified to do this part" owing to his background as an electronic engineer with air-force training, and because he was "a thinking-actor who is also well-read". Madhavan was later announced as a joint director of the film.

Filming 
Principal photography began on 4 January 2019 in Mumbai and was shot as a multilingual, with scenes simultaneously filmed in the Hindi, Tamil, and English languages. A few days after the start of the shoot, Mahadevan left the project owing to prior commitments and Madhavan took over as the project's sole director. Film director and writer Prajesh Sen, who had previously co-written Ormakalude Bhramanapadham and worked on a documentary titled Nambi The Scientist, joined the project as a co-director. Sukhmani Sadana worked on the film as an additional screenplay and dialogues writer. Scenes featuring Madhavan as the aged Narayanan were filmed first, with the actor taking up to 14 hours to get into the look following extensive make-up. During the first schedule in India, Simran joined the film's cast to portray the wife of the lead character, while actors Shah Rukh Khan and Suriya agreed to make cameo appearances in the Hindi & English and Tamil versions respectively as themselves. Both of the actors did not charge a fee for their participation in the film. Other actors who joined the cast during the production were Tamil actor Jagan to portray a scientist, Rajit Kapur to feature as Indian physicist Vikram Sarabhai in the Hindi and English versions and Ravi Raghavendra as Vikram Sarabhai in the Tamil version.

In late January 2019, the team moved to film scenes in Georgia and Russia. The team completed the shoot five days prior to the schedule, despite shooting in unfavourable weather conditions. In April and May 2019, the team shot scenes in India, with Madhavan shaving his beard to play a younger version of the character. The team subsequently moved on to film the final schedule in France and Serbia. Production was completed in Serbia during June 2019, with Scottish actors Ron Donachie and Phyllis Logan also a part of the final schedule. The shoot of the film took 44 days to complete. Post-production began in July 2019, with music composer Sam C. S. completing the background score by mid-October 2019. In August 2020, Madhavan revealed that the film had reached the final stages of post-production work and that only fifteen days of work were remaining to complete final sound mixing, mastering and digital intermediate tasks.

Music

Marketing

Tricolour Films announced the title of the film Rocketry: The Nambi Effect and unveiled a minute-long teaser for the film on 31 October 2018 to mark the start of production. A launch event also coincided with the teaser release, with Nambi Narayanan himself in attendance. A theatrical trailer of the film was released online on 1 April 2021. Madhavan recalled a conversation that he had with Narayanan to explain the trailer's release coinciding with April Fools' Day, where the scientist had described himself as a "fool" who had been the "victim of his own patriotism". Madhavan stated he hoped to dedicate the trailer to these 'fools' who are "incredible unsung heroes and make this world a better place".

The trailer received positive responses, with Manoj Kumar of The Indian Express and a reviewer from The News Minute both calling the trailer "riveting". Madhavan and Narayanan met with India's Prime Minister Narendra Modi to show him clips from the film. Modi later tweeted that the "film covers an important topic, which more people must know about" and praised the footage that he was shown. A number of film personalities including Amitabh Bachchan, Priyanka Chopra, Suriya, Hrithik Roshan and Samantha Ruth Prabhu also shared and praised the trailer.

The film premiered at the Marché du Film section of the 2022 Cannes Film Festival in France on 19 May 2022, with Madhavan and Narayanan both in attendance. The screening was also attended by India's Information and Broadcasting minister Anurag Thakur and music composer A. R. Rahman, among other film industry personalities and senior government officials.

The team then embarked on a 12-day tour across the United States, with preview screenings held at various centres including New York City, Chicago, Houston, Dallas, Arizona, Los Angeles, San Francisco and Seattle during early-June 2022. As a part of the film's promotional tour, the trailer was screened on the Nasdaq MarketSite billboard at Times Square in New York, while the team also met with the American astronaut of Indian origin, Sunita Williams, in Texas.

In mid-June 2022, Madhavan and the team returned to promote the film across India. A behind-the-scenes prologue for the film was released online, and then a promotional video showcasing the making of the film's music, along with the devotional track "Shri Venkatesa Suprabatham" was released at Sri Venkateswara Temple in Tirupati. Subsequent pre-release events were held at Kochi, New Delhi and Chennai to meet the press and hold launch events for the film. The team then moved to Dubai, United Arab Emirates to host another pre-release event at the City Centre Deira. In late June 2022, the team attended promotional events for the film in Indian cities such as Mumbai, Kolkata and Hyderabad. A further pre-release screening of the film was held at the Siri Fort auditorium in New Delhi with former director of the Central Bureau of Investigation D. R. Karthikeyan in attendance. A week after the release of the film on 1 July, Madhavan travelled to Kuala Lumpur in Malaysia to attend a special screening and promote the film.

Vistas Media Capital's metaverse, VistaVerse, launched collectable NFTs related to the film in late June 2022. It became the first Indian film to reach 10,000 NFTs claimed.

Release

Theatrical 
In September 2021, following the announcement of theatres reopening in Maharashtra after COVID-related closures, Madhavan initially announced that the film would be theatrically released on 1 April 2022 in the six languages (Hindi, Tamil, English, Malayalam, Telugu, Kannada). However, the release date was postponed. Finally, the film was released theatrically worldwide on 1 July 2022.

The film was distributed worldwide by Yash Raj Films and Phars Film Co, with UFO Moviez additionally acquiring the film's distribution rights in North India. The film's Tamil version was distributed by Udhayanidhi Stalin's Red Giant Movies in Tamil Nadu, and AGS Cinemas joining as the official multiplex partner.

Home media
The digital distribution rights were purchased by Amazon Prime Video. The film has been digitally streaming on Amazon Prime Video since 26 July 2022. The Hindi version was released on  Voot Select since 29 July 2022.

Reception

Box office 
On the first day of its release, the film collected over 65 lakhs at the domestic box office. On the second day of its release, the film grossed 2 crores. After three days of its theatrical release, the film collected around 8 crore. After four weeks from its release, the film has made a collection of 50 crores worldwide.

Critical response 
Rocketry received positive reviews from critics. Devesh Sharma of Filmfare rated the film 4 out of 5 stars and wrote "Madhavan carries the film on his shoulders. We can see that he totally believes in Nambi"s innocence and is hoping that the film will finally exonerate him in the eyes of the public. He lives and breathes the character, getting the nuances right. It"s not easy being both the lead actor and the director but Madhavan achieves the desired trajectory on both fronts". Ronak Kotecha of Times Of India gave the film 3.5 out of 5 stars and said "It has an interesting subject and an untold story of a man, who was wronged for always being right for his nation. ‘Rocketry’ takes off well, hits some turbulence on the way, but eventually soars high with real characters and moving moments that make it worth your while". Shubham Kulkarni of Koimoi rated the film 3.5 out of 5 stars and wrote "Rocketry is a movie that must be celebrated because an artist has tried to come out of his comfort zone and tell a story not many could dare. It is about a man who gave this country big achievements but was compensated with brutality. It took almost two decades for the government to give a veteran scientist a clean chit in a case he was never guilty of. It is a story that must be told and heard". Sanchita Jhunjhunwala of Zoom TV rated the film 3.5 out of 5 stars and wrote "With a roller coaster of a ride on the screen depicting the one Nambi had in real life, we feel that the movie has great potential and would keep you hooked as you watch more of it. The emotional connect is what also draws you towards the story, courtesy the performances its ability to be as real as it gets, making it a great human drama".

A critic for Bollywood Hungama rated the film 3 out of 5 stars and wrote "The Nambi Effect tells a shocking story of an ISRO genius and is embellished with an award-winning performance by R Madhavan". Pratikshya Mishra of The Quint rated the film 3 out of 5 stars and wrote "Rocketry is a well-intentioned film and works purely because of the heroic and inspirational protagonist at its helm". Nandini Ramnath of Scroll.in rated the film 2.5 out of 5 stars and wrote "Before it launches into its main argument, Rocketry lurches from one amateurish eureka moment to the next". Saibal Chatterjee of NDTV rated the film 2.5 out of 5 stars and wrote "Madhavan the actor does a fine job of traversing a spectrum of moods - from elation fuelled by the character's professional highs to anguish triggered by his plummet into ignominy".

Janani K of India Today rated the film 2.5 out of 5 stars and wrote it is "a film that could have been a phenomenal watch" and "despite the shortcomings, the story of Nambi Narayanan makes it a decent watch". In contrast, Gautaman Bhaskaran of News 18 rated the film 2.5 out of 5 stars and labelled the film as a "disappointing debut". Shubhra Gupta of The Indian Express rated the film 2.5 out of 5 stars and wrote "R Madhavan makes you believe in the character, but the writing is stodgy, and the direction doesn’t quite make up for it".

Bharathi Pradhan of Lehren rated the film 2.5 out of 5 stars and wrote "On India’s rocket programme, Rocketry: The Nambi Effect would’ve been an overwhelming and nail-biting experience". Srinivasa Ramanujam of The Hindu noted "the first half feels like a science class, but the second, packs some emotional heft to ensure Rocketry lands well", calling the intention "noble". Avinash Ramachandran of Cinema Express noted that "Madhavan, Simran propel this compelling biopic". Monika Kukeja of the Hindustan Times gave the film a positive review, noting Madhavan "is a one man army who puts up a spectacular, inspiring show".

Several Indian film industry personalities publicly praised the film including Rajinikanth, Anupam Kher, Anirudh Ravichander and Shilpa Shetty. In August 2022, the film was screened for civil servants and politicians in the Parliament of India.

References

External links 
Official website

2022 multilingual films
Indian biographical drama films
Biographical films about scientists
Films scored by Sam C. S.
2020s Hindi-language films
English-language Indian films
2020s Tamil-language films
2022 films
Films postponed due to the COVID-19 pandemic
Film productions suspended due to the COVID-19 pandemic
Drama films based on actual events
Indian multilingual films
Films based on biographies
Films shot in France
Films shot in Russia
Films shot in Bulgaria
Films shot in Serbia
Films set in New Jersey
Films set in the 1970s
Films set in the 1990s
Films set in universities and colleges
Films about educators
Princeton University
Indian Space Research Organisation in fiction
Films about outer space
2020s English-language films